Irene Richards (née O'Neill, born 1939) is a New Zealand painter from Hokitika. Two of her works are in the permanent collection of Auckland Art Gallery Toi o Tāmaki.

Biography 
Richards completed a diploma in fine arts in painting from the University of Canterbury in 1963. Her works involve nature and her Christian faith.

References 

New Zealand Christians
New Zealand painters
New Zealand women painters
People from Hokitika
1939 births
Ilam School of Fine Arts alumni
Living people